In the run up to the 2022 Israeli legislative election, various organisations carried out opinion polling to gauge voting intention in Israel during the term of the 24th Knesset. This article lists the results of such polls.

The date range for these opinion polls is from the 2021 Israeli legislative election, held on 23 March, to the present day. Due to the political deadlock that resulted after the previous election and the possibility of a fifth consecutive snap election, polling for the next election started two weeks after the previous election. The election was held on 1 November 2022. In keeping with the election silence tradition, no polls may be published from the end of the Friday before the election until the polling stations close on election day at 22:00.

Polls are listed in reverse chronological order, showing the most recent first and using the dates when the survey fieldwork was done, as opposed to the date of publication. Where the fieldwork dates are unknown, the date of publication is given instead. The highest figure in each polling survey is displayed with its background shaded in the leading party's colour. If a tie ensues, this is applied to the highest figures. When a poll has no information on a certain party, that party is instead marked by a dash (–).

Seat projections 
This section displays voting intention estimates referring to the next Knesset election. The figures listed are Knesset seat counts rather than percentages, unless otherwise stated.

Polling graph 
This graph shows the polling trends from the 2021 Israeli legislative election until the next election day using a 4-poll moving average. Scenario polls are not included here. For parties not crossing the electoral threshold (currently 3.25%) in any given poll, the number of seats is calculated as a percentage of the 120 total seats.

Polls 
Poll results are listed in the table below. Parties that fall below the electoral threshold of 3.25% are denoted by the percentage of votes that they received (N%), rather than the number of seats they would have gotten. 
61 seats are required for a majority in the Knesset.

Legend
 Gov.
— Sum of the 36th government parties: Yesh Atid, Blue & White and New Hope (now running jointly as National Unity), Yamina (now running jointly with The Jewish Home under the Jewish Home name), Labor, Yisrael Beiteinu, Meretz and Ra'am. The coalition parties are highlighted in blue.

Scenario polls 
Most often, opinion polling about hypothetical scenarios is done in the same survey as for the regular polling. This is why these scenario polls are paired for comparison purposes.

Benjamin Netanyahu supports The Jewish Home

Jewish Home drops out

Labor and Meretz form an alliance

Naftali Bennett rejoins Yamina

Itamar Ben-Gvir leading Religious Zionist Party

Yair Golan leading Meretz

Yoaz Hendel joins Yamina

Gadi Eizenkot joins B&W-NH

Gadi Eizenkot joins Yesh Atid

Blue and White, New Hope merger

Amichai Chikli forms a party & Yamina, New Hope merger

Yamina drops out

Yamina, New Hope merger

Yamina, New Hope, Yisrael Beiteinu merger & Labor, Meretz merger

Yoaz Hendel joins Yamina, Ayelet Shaked joins Likud, Religious Zionist Party & Otzma Yehudit split, Amichai Chikli forms a party

Otzma Yehudit split from Religious Zionist Party

Likud leadership

Prime minister 
Due to the political deadlock, Shas chairman and Interior Minister Aryeh Deri suggested direct elections for prime minister. Some opinion pollsters have asked voters which party leader they would prefer as prime minister. Their responses are given as percentages in the graphs and tables below.

Various candidates

Netanyahu vs. Lapid

Netanyahu vs. Gantz

Lapid vs. Gantz 
{|class="wikitable sortable" style="text-align:center; font-size:90%; line-height:13px;"
!rowspan=2 |Date
!rowspan=2 |Polling firm
!rowspan=2 |Publisher
!Lapid
!Gantz
!Neither
|-
!style=background: |
!style=background: |
!style=background:#d3d3d3 |
|-
|data-sort-value=2022-09-29 |28–29 Sep 22
|Panels Politics
|Maariv
|35					
|27					
|style=background:#d3d3d3 |38	
|-
|data-sort-value=2022-07-21 |20–21 Jul 22
|Panels Politics
|Maariv
|26					
|style=background:#d3d3d3 |28	
|–					
|-
|data-sort-value=2022-07-11 |11 Jul 22
|Kantar
|Kan 11
|26					
|26					
|style=background:#d3d3d3 |48	
|}

 Netanyahu vs. Bennett 

 Bennett vs. Gantz 

 Approval ratings 
Naftali Bennett

Benny Gantz

Yair Lapid

Yifat Shasha-Biton

Avigdor Liberman

Ayelet Shaked

Nitzan HorwitzMerav MichaeliGideon Sa'arYoaz Hendel'''

See also 
Opinion polling for the next Israeli legislative election

Notes

References

Opinion polling in Israel